Northamptonshire is a county in the East Midlands of England. The county is bordered by Warwickshire, Leicestershire, Cambridgeshire, Bedfordshire, Buckinghamshire, Oxfordshire, Rutland and Lincolnshire. It was governed by Northamptonshire County Council and seven district and borough councils, Corby, Daventry, East Northamptonshire, Kettering, Northampton, South Northamptonshire and Wellingborough but since 1 April by the unitary authorities of North Northamptonshire and West Northamptonshire. The county flower is the cowslip.

A ridge of low Jurassic hills runs through the county, separating the basins of the Welland and Nene rivers. The county has good transportation connections as it is crossed by two main railway lines and the M1 motorway, and it has many small industrial centres rather than large conurbations.

In England, Sites of Special Scientific Interest (SSSIs) are designated by Natural England, which is responsible for protecting England's natural environment. Designation as an SSSI gives legal protection to the most important wildlife and geological sites. , there are 57 sites designated in Northamptonshire, 48 for their biological interest and 9 for their geological interest. Eight are Geological Conservation Review sites, four are Nature Conservation Review sites, and fourteen are managed by the Wildlife Trust for Bedfordshire, Cambridgeshire and Northamptonshire. The largest is Upper Nene Valley Gravel Pits, which is a Ramsar internationally important wetland site and a Special Protection Area under the European Union Directive on the Conservation of Wild Birds. The smallest is Irchester Old Lodge Pit, which is described in the Geological Conservation Review as a Middle Jurassic site of national importance.

Key

Interest
B = a site of biological interest
G = a site of geological interest

Public access
FP = access to footpaths through the site only
NO = no public access to site
PP = public access to part of site
YES = public access to site

Other classifications
GCR = Geological Conservation Review
LNR = Local nature reserve
NCR = Nature Conservation Review
NNR = National nature reserve
Ramsar = Ramsar site, an internationally important wetland site
RHPG = Register of Historic Parks and Gardens
SPA = Special Protection Area under the European Union Directive on the Conservation of Wild Birds
WT = Woodland Trust
WTBCN = Wildlife Trust for Bedfordshire, Cambridgeshire and Northamptonshire

Sites

See also
List of Local Nature Reserves in Northamptonshire
Wildlife Trust for Bedfordshire, Cambridgeshire and Northamptonshire

Notes

References

Sources

 
Northamptonshire
Sites of Special